Julio César Rodríguez López (born 7 December 1995), sometimes known simply as Julio, is a Spanish professional footballer who plays as a centre-back.

Football career
Julio was born in Mieres, Asturias. A product of Sporting de Gijón's prolific youth academy, he made his senior debuts in the 2012–13 season, playing 30 games in Segunda División B for the reserves.

Julio first appeared officially with the main squad on 11 September 2013, starting in a 3–2 away loss against Recreativo de Huelva for the season's Copa del Rey. On 2 September 2014 he was definitely promoted to the main squad in Segunda División.

On 31 August 2016, Julio was loaned to Championship club Barnsley for one season, initially assigned to the Development squad. Upon returning, he cut ties with the club on 26 July 2017.

In February 2020, Julio joined Bulgarian club Tsarsko Selo Sofia.

References

External links
Sporting Gijón official profile 

1995 births
Living people
Spanish footballers
Footballers from Asturias
Association football defenders
Segunda División B players
Croatian Football League players
Liga I players
Ekstraklasa players
I liga players
First Professional Football League (Bulgaria) players
Sporting de Gijón B players
Sporting de Gijón players
Recreativo de Huelva players
NK Istra 1961 players
FC Voluntari players
FC Tsarsko Selo Sofia players
Wisła Płock players
Podbeskidzie Bielsko-Biała players
Spain youth international footballers
Spanish expatriate footballers
Spanish expatriate sportspeople in Croatia
Expatriate footballers in Croatia
Spanish expatriate sportspeople in Romania
Expatriate footballers in Romania
Spanish expatriate sportspeople in Bulgaria
Expatriate footballers in Bulgaria
Spanish expatriate sportspeople in Poland
Expatriate footballers in Poland